Diarmaid Ninian John MacCulloch  (born 31 October 1951) is an English academic and historian, specialising in ecclesiastical history and the history of Christianity. Since 1995, he has been a fellow of St Cross College, Oxford; he was formerly the senior tutor. Since 1997, he has been Professor of the History of the Church at the University of Oxford.

Though ordained a deacon in the Church of England, he declined ordination to the priesthood because of the church's attitude to homosexuality. In 2009 he encapsulated the evolution of his religious beliefs: "I was brought up in the presence of the Bible, and I remember with affection what it was like to hold a dogmatic position on the statements of Christian belief. I would now describe myself as a candid friend of Christianity." MacCulloch sits on the editorial board of the Journal of Ecclesiastical History.

Life
Diarmaid MacCulloch was born in Kent, England, to parents Nigel J. H. MacCulloch (an Anglican priest) and Jennie MacCulloch (née Chappell). He moved to Suffolk as a boy when his father was appointed rector of Wetherden. He attended Hillcroft Preparatory School, Haughley and Stowmarket Grammar School. He subsequently studied history at Churchill College, Cambridge, where he obtained a Bachelor of Arts degree in 1972; this was promoted to a Master of Arts degree in 1976. During that period, he was also organ scholar at the college. After completing a Diploma in Archive Administration at Liverpool University in 1973, he then returned to Cambridge to complete a PhD degree in 1977 on Tudor history under the supervision of Geoffrey Elton, combining this with a position as Junior Research Fellow at Churchill College.

MacCulloch joined the Gay Christian Movement in 1976, serving twice on its committee and briefly as honorary secretary. From 1978 to 1990 he tutored at Wesley College, Bristol, and taught church history in the department of theology at the University of Bristol. He interrupted his teaching to study for the Oxford Diploma in Theology (awarded 1987) at Ripon College Cuddesdon. In 1987 he was ordained a deacon in the Church of England and from 1987 to 1988 he served as a non-stipendiary minister at All Saints' Clifton with St John's in the Diocese of Bristol. However, in response to a motion put before the General Synod in 1987 by Tony Higton regarding the sexuality of clergy, he declined ordination to the priesthood and ceased to minister at Clifton.

Regarding the conflict between his homosexuality and the Church of England and his own retreat from orthodoxy he said:
I was ordained Deacon. But, being a gay man, it was just impossible to proceed further, within the conditions of the Anglican set-up, because I was determined that I would make no bones about who I was; I was brought up to be truthful, and truth has always mattered to me. The Church couldn't cope and so we parted company. It was a miserable experience.

MacCulloch was awarded a Doctor of Divinity (DD) degree by the University of Oxford in 2001; the DD is the highest degree awarded by the university.

In 1996 his book Thomas Cranmer: A Life won the James Tait Black Memorial Prize. His 2003 book Reformation: Europe's House Divided 1490–1700 won the 2004 National Book Critics Circle Award, the 2004 British Academy Book Prize and the Wolfson History Prize. A History of Christianity: The First Three Thousand Years was published in September 2009 with a related 6-part television series called A History of Christianity which first aired on BBC4 in 2009 and then on BBC2 and BBC4 in 2010. The book won McGill University's Cundill Prize, a $75,000 prize, the largest such prize in Canada at the time.

In 2012, he wrote and presented How God Made the English, a three-part documentary series tracing the history of English identity from the Dark Ages to the present day. In 2013 he presented a documentary on Thomas Cromwell and his place in English ecclesiastical and political history. His 2015 series Sex and the Church on BBC Two  explored how Christianity has shaped western attitudes to sex, gender and sexuality throughout history.

In 2018, MacCulloch published the biography Thomas Cromwell: A Life. MacCulloch sits on the European Advisory Board of Princeton University Press.

In 2019, MacCulloch retired as Professor of the History of the Church and was made professor emeritus. In addition to his position at St Cross College, he has been a senior research fellow in church history and archivist at Campion Hall, Oxford since 2020.

Honours
MacCulloch was elected a Fellow of the Society of Antiquaries of London (FSA) in 1978, a Fellow of the Royal Historical Society (FRHistS) in 1982, and a Fellow of the British Academy (FBA) in 2001. In 2003, he was awarded an honorary Doctor of Letters (DLitt) degree by the University of East Anglia. He was knighted in the 2012 New Year Honours for services to scholarship. While Debretts gives his formal style as "Prof Sir", MacCulloch has expressed the preference that he not be addressed in that manner, in accordance with protocol which dictates that clergy holding knighthoods are addressed as "Sir" only if so honoured before their ordination.

1996 James Tait Black Memorial Prize for Thomas Cranmer: A Life
2004 National Book Critics Circle Award for Reformation: Europe's House Divided 1490–1700
2004 British Academy Book Prize for Reformation: Europe's House Divided 1490–1700
2004 Wolfson History Prize for Reformation: Europe's House Divided 1490–1700
2010 Hessell-Tiltman Prize for A History of Christianity
2010 Cundill Prize for A History of Christianity

In 2021, he was awarded a Festschrift titled "Contesting Orthodoxies in the History of Christianity: Essays in Honour of Diarmaid MacCulloch".

Interviews

With Henk de Berg 
Three-part interview conducted by Henk de Berg (2018)

 Part I (on the existence of God)
 Part II (on gay marriage and women priests)
 Part III (on faith, violence and terrorism)

Appearances on In Our Time 

 Episode on William Cecil (7 March 2019)
 Episode on the Siege of Malta (11 January 2018)
 Episode on the Battle of Lepanto (12 November 2015)
 Episode on the Book of Common Prayer (17 October 2013)
 Episode on Erasmus (9 February 2012)
 Episode on Foxe's Book of Martyrs (18 November 2010)
 Episode on Calvinism (25 February 2010)
 Episode on the Siege of Münster (5 November 2009)
 Episode on the Dissolution of the Monasteries (27 March 2008)
 Episode on the Diet of Worms (12 October 2006)
 Episode on the St. Bartholomew's Day massacre (27 November 2003)

Selected works

Filmography
 A History of Christianity (2009)
 How God Made the English (2012)
 Henry VIII's Enforcer: The Rise and Fall of Thomas Cromwell (2013)
 Sex and the Church (2015)

Books
 Suffolk and the Tudors: Politics and Religion in an English County 1500–1600 (Oxford, Clarendon Press, 1986)
 Groundwork of Christian History (London, Epworth Press, 1987)
 The Later Reformation in England (1990)
 Henry VIII: Politics, Policy, and Piety (1995)
 Thomas Cranmer: A Life (1996)
 Tudor Church Militant: Edward VI and the Protestant Reformation (1999)
 republished as The Boy King: Edward VI and the Protestant Reformation (2001)
 Reformation: Europe's House Divided 1490–1700 (2003) 
 republished as The Reformation: A History (2005)
 
 Silence: A Christian History (London, Allen Lane, 2013)
 All Things Made New: The Reformation and its Legacy (London, Allen Lane, 2016)
 Thomas Cromwell: A Life (London, Allen Lane, 2018)

Critical studies, reviews and biography

References

Citations

Sources
 Crockford's Clerical Directory; 97th edition (London: Church House Publishing, 2001), p. 477.
 LGBT Religious Archives Network: profile: Diarmaid MacCulloch

External links
Profile on the website of St Cross College, Oxford
 Curriculum vitæ
 
 A History Of Christianity on BBC website

1951 births
20th-century English historians
20th-century LGBT people
21st-century English historians
21st-century LGBT people
Academics of the University of Bristol
Alumni of Churchill College, Cambridge
Alumni of Ripon College Cuddesdon
Alumni of the University of Liverpool
Anglican clergy in the United Kingdom
20th-century Anglican deacons
Anglican scholars
British gay writers
British historians of religion
English Anglicans
Historians of Protestantism
Fellows of St Cross College, Oxford
Fellows of the British Academy
Fellows of the Royal Historical Society
Fellows of the Society of Antiquaries of London
Historians of Christianity
James Tait Black Memorial Prize recipients
Knights Bachelor
LGBT and Anglicanism
LGBT Anglican clergy
LGBT historians
English LGBT people
Living people
People from Kent
Reformation historians
Contestants on University Challenge